Zaitegi (in Spanish Záitegui) is a hamlet and council located in the municipality of Zigoitia, in Álava province, Basque Country, Spain. As of 2020, it has a population of 39.

Geography 
Zaitegi is located 14km north-northwest of Vitoria-Gasteiz.

References

Populated places in Álava